Cohan is a surname of Irish origins. It is a variant of Cohane, which itself is an Anglicized form of the Irish Ó Cadhain. 

Cohan is also a variant spelling of the Hebrew surname Cohen. This version of that name is commonly found among Jews in France.

Notable people named Cohan include:

Chris Cohan (born 1950), owner of the Golden State Warriors of the NBA
Don Cohan (1930–2018), American Olympic bronze medal winner in sailing
George M. Cohan (1878–1942), American entertainer (member of Four Cohans)
Helen Cohan (1910–1996), American stage dancer, film actress
Lauren Cohan (born 1982), English-American actress
Peter Cohan, American businessman
Robert Cohan (1925–2021), British-American dancer and choreographer
Ryan Cohan (born 1971), American jazz pianist and composer
William D. Cohan (born 1960), American business writer

See also 
 Coulonges-Cohan, a commune in the Aisne department in France's Hauts-de-France region
 James Cohan Gallery an art gallery in New York City
 Cahan (disambiguation)

References

Surnames of Irish origin
Jewish surnames
Kohenitic surnames